Gisbert Wilhelm Enno Freiherr zu Innhausen und Knyphausen (born 23 April 1979 in Wiesbaden) is a German singer-songwriter from the Rheingau in Hesse.

Development
After a stay in Berlin, zu Knyphausen studied Music Therapy in Nijmegen in the Netherlands. In August 2005 he founded the Indie–Label Omaha Records together with Philipp Heintze. In the following autumn he played his first solo gig under his own name. He has since switched to using a whole band in his performances. His debut album, Gisbert zu Knyphausen was launched on 25 April 2008 by PIAS Germany. It contains solistic songs accompanied by a band. Gisbert zu Knyphausen's lyrics are often melancholic but also have a hopeful character. He mentions ClickClickDecker, Ton Steine Scherben and Element of Crime as his musical and lyrical influences. Zu Knyphausen lived in Hamburg from October 2006 to April 2010, before he moved to Berlin. On 23 April 2010 his new album Hurra! Hurra! So nicht was released.

Review
Zu Knyphausen's debut album received generally positive reviews and was called an "outstanding release" of early summer 2008. His songs have been described as laconic narratives with wry, sometimes sharp humor. Using minimal instrumental backing and the diction of the former century, he still manages to appeal to a young audience, perhaps because the Weltschmerz in his songs nevertheless hints at a some hope farther off

Discography

Albums
 Gisbert zu Knyphausen (2008)
 Hurra! Hurra! So nicht (2010)
 Das Licht dieser Welt (2017)

Singles
 Spieglein, Spieglein (2006/Sommertag EP)
 Sommertag (2008/Gisbert zu Knyphausen)
 Melancholie (2010/Hurra! Hurra! So nicht)

External links

 Gisbert zu Knyphausen on MySpace
 Interview with Gisbert zu Knyphausen on German Radio Station 1Live
 Review of the second album
 Omaha-records
 Portrait of Gisbert zu Knyphausen

References

German singer-songwriters
Living people
People from Wiesbaden
1979 births
21st-century German male singers